Elections to Allerdale Borough Council were held on 1 May 2003.  The whole council was up for election and the Labour party lost overall control of the council to no overall control.

Results

12 Labour, 4 Conservative, 2 Independent and 2 Liberal Democrat candidates were unopposed.

By ward

External links
BBC report of 2003 Allerdale election results BBC News
Election results from Allerdale Council website

2003 English local elections
2003
2000s in Cumbria